The Sukhdev Vihar metro station is newly opened located on the Magenta Line of the Delhi Metro and situated at Sukhdev Vihar

Sukhdev Vihar is a Posh area of south east Delhi and adjoining to New Friends colony

As part of Phase III of Delhi Metro, Sukhdev Vihar is the newly opened metro station of the Magenta Line.

The station

Structure
Sukhdev Vihar elevated metro station situated on the Magenta Line of Delhi Metro.

Station layout

Facilities

Entry/Exit

Connections

Bus
Delhi Transport Corporation bus routes number 463, 534, 534A serves the station.

See also

Delhi
List of Delhi Metro stations
Transport in Delhi
Delhi Metro Rail Corporation
Delhi Suburban Railway
Delhi Monorail
Delhi Transport Corporation
South East Delhi
Jamia Millia Islamia
Okhla Sanctuary
Okhla railway station
National Capital Region (India)
List of rapid transit systems
List of metro systems

References

External links

 Delhi Metro Rail Corporation Ltd. (Official site) 
 Delhi Metro Annual Reports
 
 UrbanRail.Net – descriptions of all metro systems in the world, each with a schematic map showing all stations.

Delhi Metro stations
Railway stations in India opened in 2017
Railway stations in South East Delhi district